Victor Dumitrescu (25 September 1924 – 15 March 1997) was a Romanian footballer who played as left back.
Dumitrescu began his football career at the age of 10, in the neighbour city of Deva. He played ten years for Corvinul Deva, beginning as a youth and finishing as a senior. In 1946, he moved to Sebeş, playing well for Surianul, and after two years he signed with Flacăra Mediaş. After three years in Mediaş, Dumitrescu joined Steaua București. He played eight years for his side, being a part of Steaua's Golden Team of the 1950s. He is the single player of the Golden Team who had never played for Romania national football team.

Honours

Club 
Steaua București
Liga I (3):  1952, 1953, 1956
Cupa României (2): 1952, 1955

External links 
Profile at Steauafc.com 

1924 births
1997 deaths
People from Orăștie
Romanian footballers
CS Corvinul Hunedoara players
FC Steaua București players
FC Steaua București assistant managers
Association football defenders